Sacred Ground is the second studio album by American country music band McBride & the Ride. It produced three singles for the trio, all of which were Top Five hits on the Billboard Hot Country Singles & Tracks (now Hot Country Songs) charts: "Just One Night", "Going out of My Mind", and "Sacred Ground", which was originally recorded by Kix Brooks (of Brooks & Dunn) on his self-titled debut album. Also included on this album is a cover of "All I Have to Offer You Is Me", originally recorded by Charley Pride. The album has also been certified gold by the RIAA. "I'm the One" was later covered by Ricky Van Shelton on his 2000 album Fried Green Tomatoes, which also includes his cover of "All I Have to Offer You Is Me." "Baby, I'm Loving You Now" features lead vocals by guitarist Ray Herndon.

Track listing

Chart performance

References

1992 albums
MCA Records albums
McBride & the Ride albums
Albums produced by Tony Brown (record producer)